Berberis schwerinii is a species of plant in the family Berberidaceae. It is endemic to Ecuador.  Its natural habitat is subtropical or tropical high-altitude grassland.

References

Endemic flora of Ecuador
schwerinii
Data deficient plants
Taxonomy articles created by Polbot